The following is the 1996–97 United States network television schedule for United States broadcast television on all six commercial television networks for the fall season beginning in September 1996 and ending in August 1997. All times are Eastern and Pacific, with certain exceptions, such as Monday Night Football.

New series highlighted in bold.

Each of the 30 highest-rated shows is listed with its rank and rating as determined by Nielsen Media Research.

 Yellow indicates the programs in the top 10 for the season.
 Cyan indicates the programs in the top 20 for the season.
 Magenta indicates the programs in the top 30 for the season.
Other Legend
 Light blue indicates local programming.
 Gray indicates encore programming.
 Blue-gray indicates news programming.
 Light green indicates sporting events.
 Light Purple indicates movies. 
 Red indicates series being burned off and other regularly scheduled programs, include

PBS is not included; member stations have local flexibility over most of their schedules and broadcast times for network shows may vary.

Sunday

Monday 

Note: On CBS, the debut of Ink was delayed by a month due to production problems, resulting in another new sitcom, Pearl, which aired temporarily in its slot before moving to its own originally designated Wednesday time period in late October.

Tuesday

Wednesday 

Note: On CBS, due to the effect of the debut delay of Ink on Monday, the first month of the new season on this night aired Almost Perfect at 8:30 p.m., followed by CBS Wednesday Movies at 9 p.m. The originally planned fall Wednesday lineup took shape at the end of October with Pearl taking over at 8:30 p.m., Almost Perfect moving to 9 p.m., Public Morals debuting at 9:30 p.m., and EZ Streets debuting at 10 p.m. This lasted for only one week in late October. CBS cancelled Public Morals after it aired the 1st, and only, episode. This meant Almost
Perfect would soon be cancelled. EZ Streets would be given a 2nd chance in the spring.

Thursday

Friday 

Note: CBS picked up JAG after NBC cancelled it due to low ratings and it became a success afterwards.

This is the last season of Family Matters and Step by Step and the only season of Clueless to air on ABC's TGIF block, until the following season, the former two shows were picked up by CBS and Clueless moved to UPN on Tuesdays.

Saturday  

Note: America's Most Wanted would debut in November at 9:00 on Fox.  Married... with Children moved to Sundays at 7-8pm in November, Mondays at 9:30 in January, and Mondays at 9pm in February. Lawless was canceled after one episode.

By network

ABC

Returning series
20/20
The ABC Sunday Night Movie
America's Funniest Home Videos 
Boy Meets World 
Coach 
The Drew Carey Show
Ellen
Family Matters
Grace Under Fire 
Hangin' with Mr. Cooper 
High Incident 
Home Improvement 
Lois & Clark: The New Adventures of Superman 
Monday Night Football 
Murder One 
NYPD Blue
Primetime Live
Roseanne 
Second Noah 
Step by Step
Turning Point

New series
Arsenio
Clueless
Common Law
Dangerous Minds
Gun
Leaving L.A.
Life's Work
The Practice
Relativity
Sabrina the Teenage Witch
Soul Man 
Spin City
Spy Game
Townies
Vital Signs

Canceled/Ended
Aliens in the Family
Before They Were Stars
Buddies
Champs
Charlie Grace
The Commish
The Dana Carvey Show
The Faculty
Hudson Street
The Jeff Foxworthy Show (moved to NBC)
The Marshal
Maybe This Time
The Monroes
Muppets Tonight
The Naked Truth (moved to NBC)
World's Funniest Videos

CBS

Returning series
48 Hours
60 Minutes
Almost Perfect
CBS Sunday Movie
Chicago Hope
Cybill
Dave's World
Diagnosis Murder
Dr. Quinn, Medicine Woman
JAG (moved from NBC)
Murphy Brown
The Nanny
Nash Bridges
Touched by an Angel
Walker, Texas Ranger

New series
Cosby
Early Edition
Everybody Loves Raymond
EZ Streets
Feds
Ink
Life... and Stuff
Mr. & Mrs. Smith
Moloney
Orleans
Pearl
Promised Land
Public Morals
Temporarily Yours

Canceled/Ended
American Gothic
Bless This House
The Bonnie Hunt Show
Can't Hurry Love
Central Park West
The Client
Courthouse
Due South
Dweebs
High Society
The Louie Show
Matt Waters
Murder, She Wrote
My Guys
Picket Fences
Rescue 911
New York News

Fox

Returning series
America's Most Wanted
Beverly Hills, 90210
COPS
FOX Night at the Movies
Living Single
Married... with Children
Martin
Melrose Place
Ned and Stacey
New York Undercover
Party of Five
The Simpsons
Sliders
The X-Files

New series
Beyond Belief: Fact or Fiction
Big Deal
King of the Hill
Lawless
Love and Marriage
Lush Life
Millennium
Pacific Palisades
Party Girl
Pauly
Roar

Canceled/Ended
The Crew
L.A. Firefighters
The Last Frontier
Local Heroes
Misery Loves Company
Partners
The Preston Episodes
Profit
The Show
Space: Above and Beyond
Strange Luck
Too Something
What's So Funny?

NBC

Returning series
3rd Rock from the Sun
Boston Common
Caroline in the City
Dateline NBC
ER
Frasier
Friends
Homicide: Life on the Street
The Jeff Foxworthy Show (moved from ABC)
The John Larroquette Show
Law & Order
Mad About You
The Naked Truth (moved from ABC)
NBC Sunday Night Movie
The NBC Monday Movie
NewsRadio
Seinfeld
The Single Guy
Unsolved Mysteries
Wings

New series
Chicago Sons
Crisis Center
Dark Skies
Fired Up
Just Shoot Me!
Men Behaving Badly
Mr. Rhodes
The Pretender
Prince Street
Profiler
Something So Right
Suddenly Susan

Canceled/Ended
Brotherly Love (moved to The WB)
The Fresh Prince of Bel-Air (returning on HBO Max in 2020)
The Home Court
Hope and Gloria
In the House (moved to UPN)
JAG (moved to CBS)
Malibu Shores
The Pursuit of Happiness
seaQuest 2032
Sisters

UPN

Returning series
In the House (moved from NBC)
Moesha
The Sentinel
Star Trek: Voyager

New series
The Burning Zone
Goode Behavior
Homeboys in Outer Space
Malcolm & Eddie
Social Studies
Sparks

Canceled/Ended
Deadly Games
Live Shot
Minor Adjustments
Nowhere Man
The Paranormal Borderline
Swift Justice

The WB

Returning series
Brotherly Love (moved from NBC)
Kirk
The Parent 'Hood
Savannah
Sister, Sister
Unhappily Ever After
The Wayans Bros.

New series
7th Heaven
Buffy the Vampire Slayer
The Jamie Foxx Show
Life with Roger
Nick Freno: Licensed Teacher
Smart Guy
The Steve Harvey Show

Canceled/Ended
Cleghorne!
First Time Out
Pinky and the Brain (moved to Kids' WB in daytime)
Simon

References

United States primetime network television schedules
United States Network Television Schedule, 1996 97
United States Network Television Schedule, 1996 97